Warji is a Local Government Area of Bauchi State, Nigeria. Its headquarters is in the town of Warji.

It has an area of 625 km and a population of 114,720 at the 2006 census.

The postal code of the area is 742.

References

Local Government Areas in Bauchi State